In enzymology, a NAD+ synthase (glutamine-hydrolysing) is an enzyme that catalyzes the chemical reaction

ATP + deamido-NAD+ + L-glutamine + H2O  AMP + diphosphate + NAD+ + L-glutamate. In eukaryotes, this enzyme contains a glutaminase domain related to nitrilase.

The substrates of this enzyme are ATP, deamido-NAD+, L-glutamine, and H2O, whereas its 4 products are AMP, diphosphate, NAD+, and glutamate 

This enzyme participates in glutamate metabolism and nicotinate and nicotinamide metabolism.

Nomenclature 

This enzyme belongs to the family of ligases, specifically those forming carbon-nitrogen bonds carbon-nitrogen ligases with glutamine as amido-N-donor.  The systematic name of this enzyme class is deamido-NAD+:L-glutamine amido-ligase (AMP-forming).

References 

EC 6.3.5
NADH-dependent enzymes
Enzymes of known structure